The Copenhagen–Fredericia/Taulov Line is the Danish railway line between the capital, Copenhagen, and the Jutland peninsula by way of Funen. Being one of the main arteries of the Danish railway network, it has double track and is fully electrified.

The line is composed of the railway line across Zealand (the West Line) and the main line across Funen (Queen Louise's Railway), both of which were built during the mid-19th century. Originally connected by the Great Belt ferries, these two lines were joined in 1997 by the Great Belt Fixed Link.

History
The railway from Copenhagen to Roskilde, Denmark's first railway line, which was completed for the Zealand Railway Company (Det Sjællandske Jernbaneselskab) by British engineering company William Radford. It was on 26 June 1847. The section from Roskilde to Korsør was completed in 1856.

The railway line from Nyborg to Middelfart was inaugurated on 8 September 1865. It was built by Peto, Brassey and Betts. In Middelfart, passengers could catch the steam ferry to Snoghøj, Jutland. On 1 November 1866, the railway was extended from Middelfart to Strib. Denmark's first train ferry was introduced on Strib-Fredericia in 1872.

Connections to other lines 
 Being connected to Copenhagen, there are transfers to the S-train network, the Coast Line and the Oresund Railway.
 Roskilde station is linked to the Kalundborg Line and to Næstved via Køge (Lille Syd).
 The line to Rødby Harbour joins the line at Ringsted (see also Fugleflugtslinjen).
 Slagelse station is a terminus for the Tølløse Line, operated by regional trains.
 The Svendborg Line starts at Odense station.
 The Fredericia–Århus Line continues northward through Jutland at Fredericia station.
 The Snoghøj–Taulov segment is a direct connection to the Fredericia–Padborg Line, avoiding the need to change direction at Fredericia.

See also
 Transport in Denmark

References 

Railway lines in Denmark
Rail transport in the Capital Region of Denmark
Rail transport in Region Zealand
Rail transport in the Region of Southern Denmark